A special election was held in the U.S. state of Minnesota on February 4, 2020, to elect a new member for District 30A in the Minnesota House of Representatives, caused by the resignation of Republican member Nick Zerwas. A primary election was held on January 14, 2020, to nominate Republican candidate. Paul Novotny, the Republican nominee, won the special election.

Background 
On November 25, 2019, District 30A incumbent Nick Zerwas announced he would resign a week later on December 6. Zerwas, who was born with a congenital heart defect and had recently undergone heart surgery, said he would like to spend more time with his family and to better support them outside of the Legislature. On November 27, 2019, Governor Tim Walz announced the date of the special election, which will be held before and allow the winner to be seated by the February 11 reconvening of the 91st Minnesota Legislature.

District 30A represents southeastern Sherburne County and a small part of northeastern Wright County. Zerwas first represented the district after winning election in 2012, succeeding fellow Republican Mary Kiffmeyer, who retired to seek election to the Minnesota Senate. In the last election in 2018, Zerwas won with 64 percent of the vote.

Candidates 
The candidate filing period was from December 3 to December 10, 2019.

Republican Party of Minnesota 
District 30A Republican delegates held a convention to endorse a candidate in Elk River on December 7, 2019. Paul Novotny won the endorsement over Kathy Ziebarth on the first ballot. Ziebarth said after the convention she would continue to seek the Republican nomination in the primary election.

 Paul Novotny, Sherburne County sheriff's office sergeant
 Kathy Ziebarth, registered nurse anesthetist; U.S. Air Force veteran

Minnesota Democratic–Farmer–Labor Party 
 Chad Hobot, internet marketer

Withdrawn 
 Michelle Rockhill

Primary election

Results

Results

See also
 2020 Minnesota House of Representatives District 60A special election
 List of special elections to the Minnesota House of Representatives

References

External links 
 Elections & Voting - Minnesota Secretary of State
 District 30A special election - Minnesota Secretary of State 

2020 Minnesota elections
Minnesota special elections